Barbara Adriaens, alias Willem Adriaens (1611 –  fl. 1636), was a Dutch soldier. Her case belongs to the most known and well documented legal cases of female transvestism and homosexuality during the early modern age in the Netherlands.

Adriaens was at the age of thirteen placed in a house of correction for public drunkenness. After she was released, she tried to support herself as a domestic and a seamstress. In 1627 or 1628, she adopted male clothing and presented as male under the name Willem Adriaens. As such, she enlisted in the army. In Amsterdam, she married a woman, Hilletje Jans, who did not know of her anatomy. She avoided consummating the marriage by claiming to be sick. Her wife suspected her to be female, and after having accused her of this in public after an argument outside a public house, they caused a riot where Adriaens was almost lynched and then brought to trial. She stated in court that she had never felt sexual attraction to males, and her landlady witnessed that she was known to have a taste for female prostitutes. Homosexuality was punishable by death, but this law was in fact not used for female homosexuality, as intercourse was defined by penetration, and it was therefore deemed necessary that a female have a clitoris big enough to penetrate a woman with for the penetration to be considered a sexual act. Another criterion was that the women live together in a male and one female role. The last criterion was fulfilled, and the prosecutor recommended the death penalty. However, the French Duchess de Bouillon, who was visiting the town at this point, took an interest in the case and prevented a death sentence. Instead, Adriaens was banished for a period of 24 years: according to reports, she was escorted out of town by great crowds. Her wife was given no punishment as she, which was common, was deemed not to have known anything of the true gender of her spouse. In 1636, Adriaens was again tried for the identical crime in Groningen, where she had lived as a man and married a woman, Alke Peter. This time she was banished for life. Her later life is unknown.

References 

 Rudolf Dekker & Lotte van de Pol (1995). Kvinnor i manskläder. En avvikande tradition. Europa 1500–1800. Stockholm: Östlings Bokförlag Symposion.  (In Swedish)
  Adriaens, Barbara Pieters (ca. 1611-after 1636)

1611 births
17th-century Dutch military personnel
Dutch LGBT people
Year of death missing
Female wartime cross-dressers
17th-century LGBT people
People prosecuted under anti-homosexuality laws